The Archeparchy of Făgăraș and Alba Iulia, in Romanian Arhieparhia de Făgăraș și Alba Iulia, is the only archeparchy of the Romanian Church United with Rome (Romanian Greek-Catholic Church). Its Metropolitan, who holds the rank of Major Archbishop, is the head of the Greek Catholic (also known as Byzantine Rite) Church in Romania. The title of "Major Archbishop" is one of only four such posts in the world. The suffragan dioceses in Romania are: (Cluj–Gherla, Lugoj, Maramureș, Oradea Mare, Saint Basil the Great of Bucharest). Only the diocese in America, the Romanian Greek Catholic Eparchy of St George, is exempt. The Eparchy of St. George takes part in the Church's synod.

The cathedral church of the archeparchy is the Holy Trinity Cathedral, Blaj (Catedrala Mitropolitană Greco-Catolică Sfânta Treime).

On 18 May 1721 it was established as the Metropolitan Archeparchy of Făgăraș. On 16 November 1854 it was renamed Metropolitan Archeparchy of Făgăraș and Alba Iulia (Fagarasien(sis) et Albae Iulien(sis) Romenorum in Latin). On 16 December 2005 it was promoted to Major Archeparchy of Făgăraș and Alba Iulia.

See also
List of Major Archbishops of Făgăraș and Alba Iulia

External links
 GCatholic.org information on the Major Archdiocese
 Religious Leaders data per April 2006

Romanian Greek Catholic Major Archeparchy of Făgăraș and Alba Iulia